Mark Andrew Winstanley (born 22 January 1968 in St Helens) is a former professional footballer, mainly playing in central defence.

Winstanley began his career at Bolton Wanderers, making his debut under then manager Phil Neal. He played on the winning side at Wembley in 1989 in the Football League Trophy final. He was instrumental in Bolton's cup-runs of the early nineties and saw the club back into the second tier of English football in 1993. He then moved on to Burnley where he also made over 100 appearances, before playing for a string of other clubs in the lower divisions, and finishing his career with non-league Southport.

In April 2020, he told The Bolton News that he had a life saving bone marrow transplant operation for leukaemia after being diagnosed in 2018.

References

External links

1968 births
Living people
Bolton Wanderers F.C. players
Burnley F.C. players
Shrewsbury Town F.C. players
Scunthorpe United F.C. players
Preston North End F.C. players
Southport F.C. players
Association football defenders
English footballers